Mr. & Ms. Rowdy is a 2019 Indian Malayalam-language buddy comedy film co-written and directed by Jeethu Joseph. Film produced by Gokulam Gopalan and Jeethu Joseph under the banner of Sree Gokulam Movies. The film features Kalidas Jayaram, Aparna Balamurali, Ganapathi and Shebin Benson in lead roles

Synopsis
Appu, Pathrose, Antony and Tito Wilson are four friends who are part time goons. What will happen when Poornima a simple girl comes into Appu's life?  Will they fall in love or will be at loggerheads?

Cast

Music
The film score is composed by Anil Johnson while the songs featured in the film are composed by Arun Vijay, Lyrics for which are written by Harinarayanan.

Production
The teaser video of Mr. & Ms. Rowdy was released on 11 January 2019. The trailer video of Mr. & Ms. Rowdy was released on 25 January 2019.

Reception
The Times of India gave 3.5 out of 5 and wrote, "Mr and Ms Rowdy can sure be a great one-time watch, for the chemistry of the lead actors and the comedy in their goofiness."

References

External links

2010s Malayalam-language films
Films directed by Jeethu Joseph